The 1991 Yugoslav Open was a men's tennis tournament played on outdoor clay courts in Umag, Croatia that was part of the World Series (Designated Week) of the 1991 ATP Tour. It was the second edition of the tournament and was held from 13 May until 19 May 1991. Unseeded Dimitri Poliakov, who entered the main draw as a qualifier, won the singles title.

Finals

Singles

 Dimitri Poliakov defeated  Javier Sánchez, 6–4, 6–4
 It was Poliakov's only singles title of his career.

Doubles
 Gilad Bloom /  Javier Sánchez defeated  Richey Reneberg /  David Wheaton, 7–6, 2–6, 6–1

References

External links
 ITF tournament edition profile

Croatia Open Umag
Croatia Open
1991 in Croatian tennis